Amursky is a rural locality (a settlement) in Lesnoy Selsoviet, Biysky District, Altai Krai, Russia. The population was 306 as of 2013. There are 11 streets.

Geography 
Amursky is located 12 km southeast of Biysk (the district's administrative centre) by road. Lesnoye is the nearest rural locality.

References 

Rural localities in Biysky District